Coprinopsis mexicana is a species of fungus in the family Psathyrellaceae. Originally described in 1918 as Coprinus mexicanus by American mycologist William Alphonso Murrill, it was transferred to Coprinopsis in 2001.

See also
List of Coprinopsis species

References

External links

mexicana
Fungi of North America
Fungi described in 1918
Taxa named by William Alphonso Murrill